"We Outchea" is a song by the American hip hop recording artist Ace Hood from his fourth studio album, Trials & Tribulations. It was released on May 27, 2013, by We the Best Music Group, Cash Money and Republic, as the second single from the album. The song, produced by Lee On The Beats, features a guest appearances by the American rapper Lil Wayne. The song peaked at number 19 on the U.S. Billboard Bubbling Under Hot 100 Singles chart.

Background 
The song was premiered on May 14, 2013, when it was announced as the second single from Trials & Tribulations. It was released to iTunes on June 5, 2013.

Critical reception 
XXL praised the single, calling it "triumphant". On the other hand, HipHopDX called the Lil Wayne guest appearance "inevitable" and said the song had a "lackluster appeal", that Wayne makes fade even more. The song's sound was compared to the previous Ace Hood and Lil Wayne collaboration "Hustle Hard".

Music video 
The music video for "We Outchea", directed by Colin Tilley, was filmed in mid-June, with a behind-the-scenes video being released on June 18, 2013. The full video was released on June 29, 2013. It had cameo appearances by DJ Khaled and Birdman. Up to April 2021, it had had over 10 million views.

Charts

Release history

References 

2013 singles
Ace Hood songs
Lil Wayne songs
Songs written by Lil Wayne
Cash Money Records singles
2013 songs
Songs written by Ace Hood
Republic Records singles
Songs written by Lee on the Beats
Music videos directed by Colin Tilley